John David Leah (born 3 August 1978) is a Welsh footballer who plays as a midfielder. He briefly played in the Football League for Darlington.

Career

Leah began his career as a youth team player with Llansantffraid, making his first team debut in August 1996. After a short spell with Newtown, Leah joined Football League Third Division side Darlington where he made 10 appearances in all competitions before returning to Newtown in 2000. In 2001, Leah rejoined Total Network Solutions and remained with the side following their renaming as The New Saints in 2006, being named Welsh Premier League Player of the Year for the 2006–07 season.

Leah was released by The New Saints in April 2009, instead signing with Rhyl. Financial problems at the club saw Leah almost return to Newtown during the 2010 January transfer window however, after rejecting the move, Leah was named captain of the club.

In January 2011 he moved to Airbus UK. After a year and a half at Airbus, John returned to Rhyl F.C.

Personal life

He studied for a degree in Physiotherapy at the University of Salford and graduated in the summer of 2011.

Honours
 Welsh Premier League Player of the Season: 2006–07
 Welsh Premier League Team of the Year: 2006–07, 2007–08, 2008–09

References

External links

Welsh Premier profile

1978 births
Living people
Welsh footballers
The New Saints F.C. players
Rhyl F.C. players
Newtown A.F.C. players
Darlington F.C. players
Cymru Premier players
English Football League players
Alumni of the University of Salford
Airbus UK Broughton F.C. players
Association football midfielders